Zhan Jiang may refer to:

 Zhanjiang, a city in Guangdong province, Southern China
 Zhan Jiang (swimmer) (born 1968), Chinese former swimmer